Foreyia is an extinct genus of coelacanth lobe-finned fish which lived during the Middle Triassic period in what is now Canton of Graubünden, Switzerland. It contains a single species F. maxkuhni.

Description and classification

F. maxkuhni is an aberrant-looking member of the family Latimeriidae, with a proportionally enormous head, a curved, beak-like maxilla, an underbite, and a low, horn-like point on its otherwise dome-like head. Despite such a bizarre appearance, phylogenetic analyses squarely place F. maxkuhni as the sister taxon of Ticinepomis, another latimeriid also found in the same strata. The two latimeriids share numerous anatomical traits with each other, strongly suggesting a close relation.

Naming
The generic name honors the late Peter L. Forey for his contributions to the study of coelacanth fishes. The specific epithet honors Max Kuhn, who had been instrumental in preparing fossils from Monte San Giorgio for 12 years, including the holotype and paratype specimens of F. maxkuhni.

References

Latimeriidae
Prehistoric lobe-finned fish genera
Triassic bony fish
Triassic fish of Europe
Fossil taxa described in 2017